Yang may refer to: 

 Yang, in yin and yang, one half of the two symbolic polarities in Chinese philosophy
 Korean yang, former unit of currency of Korea from 1892 to 1902
 YANG, a data modeling language for the NETCONF network configuration protocol

Geography
 Yang County, in Shaanxi, China
 Yangzhou (ancient China), also known as Yang Prefecture
 Yang (state), ancient Chinese state
 Yang, Iran, a village in Razavi Khorasan Province
 Yang River (disambiguation)

People
 Yang, one of the names for the Karen people in the Thai language
Yang di-Pertuan Agong, the constitutional monarch of Malaysia
 Yang (surname), Chinese surname
 Yang (Korean surname)

Fictional characters
 Cristina Yang, on the TV show Grey's Anatomy
 Yang, from the show Yin Yang Yo!
 Yang, Experiment 502 in Lilo and Stitch: The Series
 Yang Fang Leiden, from Final Fantasy IV
 Yang Lee, in the Street Fighter III series of videogames
 Mr. Yang, the Yin Yang serial killer in an episode of Psych
 Yang Wen-li, from Legend of the Galactic Heroes
 Yang Xiao Long, a character from the RWBY animated series

See also
 Yang-style t'ai chi ch'uan, a Chinese martial art named after the Yang family